T0 or T00 may refer to:
 T0 space, a Kolmogorov space
 HMNZS Wakakura (T00), a First World War Royal New Zealand Navy Castle class naval trawler 
 Same-day affirmation of a trade in finance

and also :
 a non-small cell lung carcinoma staging code for no evidence of primary tumor 
 T00 : Chambers County Airport FAA LID
 a level on the tornado TORRO scale

See also
Tzero, an electric sports car